Chelsea McMullan is a Canadian documentary filmmaker, best known for her 2013 film My Prairie Home, a film about transgender musician Rae Spoon.

Early life 
McMullan grew up in Langley, British Columbia as an avid basketball player. She received a basketball scholarship to play at Brookswood Secondary School and was scouted to play at the university level in Canada, but eventually decided to pursue her interest in film.

Career
Her early film credits include the documentary films Derailments (Deragliamenti) and The Way Must Be Tried, and the short films Plume and Bath Time. McMullan has worked on several projects with the National Film Board of Canada. In addition to My Prairie Home, her prior films Mise en Scène and Deadman were made for the NFB; she first met Spoon when she wanted to secure rights to one of Spoon's songs as background music for Deadman.

My Prairie Home competed in the World Cinema Documentary program at the 2014 Sundance Film Festival, and was shortlisted for the Canadian Screen Award for Best Feature Length Documentary at the 2nd Canadian Screen Awards.

McMullan's 2015 film World Famous Gopher Hole Museum was shortlisted for the Canadian Screen Award for Best Short Documentary at the 4th Canadian Screen Awards.

In 2022, McMullan and Tanya Tagaq collaborated on the film Ever Deadly. Her film, Crystal Pite: Angels’ Atlas, was also released in 2022.

Her forthcoming projects include a documentary film, Michael Shannon Michael Shannon John, and a narrative feature film, Swan Killer.

See also
 List of female film and television directors
 List of LGBT-related films directed by women

References

External links

Mise en Scène at NFB.ca

Canadian documentary film directors
Canadian women film directors
Living people
Year of birth missing (living people)
People from Langley, British Columbia (city)
Canadian women documentary filmmakers